Robert Pierce is founder of the charity World Vision.

Robert Pierce may also refer to:

Robert W. Pierce (1821–1914), Wisconsin state assemblyman
Robert L. Pierce (1901–1968), Chairman of the Republican Party of Wisconsin
Robert Pierce (basketball), head coach for USC
Rob Pierce, musician with the Dead Rabbits

See also
Bobby Pierce (disambiguation)
Robert Peirce (disambiguation)
Robert Pearce (disambiguation)